The 1989 Arkansas Razorbacks football team represented the University of Arkansas during the 1989 NCAA Division I-A football season. In Ken Hatfield's final year at UA, the Razorbacks went 10–2, and won their second straight SWC championship. Arkansas' victory over Texas A&M at Kyle Field in College Station broke an Aggie home-conference win streak of 22 consecutive games. However, Arkansas lost their fourth-straight bowl game and second consecutive Cotton Bowl Classic.

Offensive tackle Jim Mabry was a consensus All-American for the Hogs.

Another All-American was freshman kicker Todd Wright, who landed 20 of 23 field goals on the year, including a 51-yard field goal against UTEP. His average of 1.82 per game tied as best in the league and with future NFL kicker Chris Gardocki from Clemson.

As a team, the Razorbacks were the seventh-best rushing offense in college football, with an average of 314.2 yards per game on the ground.

Hatfield led Arkansas to back-to-back Southwest Conference titles in 1988-89, going 20-4 in that time including 14-1 against conference opponents. However, due to a sour relationship with Frank Broyles as a result of his hands-on approach as A.D., Hatfield left Arkansas to become the head coach of Clemson after the 1989 season. In fact, Hatfield accepted the Clemson job without ever visiting the campus prior to his hiring.

Schedule

Roster

Season summary

Texas

Houston

References

Arkansas
Arkansas Razorbacks football seasons
Southwest Conference football champion seasons
Arkansas Razorbacks football